Dzerzhinsky City District is one of the seven city districts of Perm. Population:

Name
The city district is called after Felix Dzerzhinsky, a Soviet revolutionary and politician.

Geography
The city district is situated on both banks of the Kama River. Two other rivers flowing through it are the Mulyanka and the Danilikha.

Notable streets
Lenina Street, Plekhanova Street, and Parkovy Avenue are the largest streets in the district. Park Avenue was formerly named Voroshilov Avenue until the late 1980s.

References

Notes

Sources
 С. А. Торопов. Пермь: путеводитель. — Пермь: Кн. изд-во, 1986.

City districts of Perm, Russia